The Roman Catholic Diocese of Vanimo is  a suffragan diocese in the Latin rite ecclesiastical province of the Metropolitan Archdiocese of Madang in Papua New Guinea, yet depends on the Roman Congregation for the Evangelization of Peoples.

Its cathedral episcopal see is the Holy Cross Pro-cathedral, in Vanimo in the province of West Sepik (Sandaun).

Statistics 
As per 2015, it pastorally served 37,765 Catholics (34.0% of 111,000 total population) on 26,000 km² in 13 parishes and 96 missions with 26 priests (8 diocesan, 18 religious), 43 lay religious (20 brothers, 23 sisters) and 14 seminarians.

History 
 It was erected in 1963.09.13 as Apostolic Vicariate of Vanimo / Uanimitanus (Latin adjective), on territory split off from the then Apostolic Vicariate of Aitape (now a diocese)
 Promoted on 1966.11.15 as Diocese of Vanimo / Uanimitan(us) (Latin).

Ordinaries 
(all Roman rite, initially foreign members of missionary congregations)

Apostolic Prefect of Vanimo
 Paschal Sweeney, Passionists (C.P.) (born Australia) (1963.09.20 – 1966.11.15 see below) 

Suffragan Bishops of Vanimo
 Paschal Sweeney, C.P. (see above 1966.11.15 – retired 1979.09.22), died 1981
 John Etheridge, C.P. (born Australia) (1980.04.24 – retired 1989.02.07), died 2002
 Apostolic Administrator Father David Wilkie, C.P. (1989 – 1991.12.21), no other prelature
 Cesare Bonivento, Pontifical Institute for Foreign Missions (P.I.M.E.) (born Italy) (1991.12.21 – retired 2018.02.05)
 Francis Meli (first native incumbent) (2018.02.05 – ...).

See also 
 List of Catholic Dioceses in Papua New Guinea

References

Sources and External links 
 GCatholic, with Google satellite HQ picture - data for all sections
 

Vanimo